Langille Glacier is an alpine glacier on the north slope of Mount Hood in the U.S. state of Oregon. The glacier lies entirely within Mount Hood Wilderness and is connected to Eliot Glacier to the south. Langille glacier is named after William Alexander Langille.

See also
List of glaciers in the United States

References

Glaciers of Mount Hood
Glaciers of Hood River County, Oregon
Mount Hood National Forest
Glaciers of Oregon